The North Dakota State Bison baseball team is the varsity intercollegiate baseball program of North Dakota State Bison in Fargo, North Dakota, United States. The program's first season was in 1909, and it has been a member of the NCAA Division I Summit League since the start of the 2008 season. Its home venue is Newman Outdoor Field, located on North Dakota State's campus. Tyler Oakes is the team's head coach in his second season. The program has appeared in 2 NCAA Tournaments. It has won 5 conference tournament championships and 2 regular season conference titles. As of the start of the 2021 Major League Baseball season, 2 former Bison have appeared in Major League Baseball and 4 have appeared in Minor League Baseball.

History

Early history
The program's first season of play was 1909.

Conference affiliations
 North Central Conference (1958–2004)
 Independent (2005–2007)
 Summit League (2008–present)

Newman Outdoor Field

The stadium contains the Maury Wills Museum in honor of the former Major League Baseball player who worked for the RedHawks as a coach and a radio analyst.

The first number retired at the stadium was the #8 worn by hometown hero Roger Maris when he played for the Fargo-Moorhead Twins in the 1950s.  The outfield distances replicate those of Yankee stadium where Maris made history.

In 2012, college baseball writer Eric Sorenson ranked the field the sixth most underrated venue in Division I baseball.

Head coaches
North Dakota State's longest tenured head coach was Mitch McLeod, who coached the team from 1993–2007.
North Dakota State's most successful coach in the Division 1 era is Tod Brown who had a record of 341–350 in his 14 seasons at NDSU. He also led the Bison to two NCAA Tournament berths in 2014 and 2021, including the Bison's first NCAA Tournament win when they defeated Nevada 6–1 at the Stanford Regional in the 2021 NCAA Division I baseball tournament.

Postseason history

NCAA Division I Tournament results
The Bison have appeared in two NCAA Division I Tournaments. Their combined record is 1-4.

Notable former players
Below is a list of notable former Bison and the seasons in which they played for North Dakota State.

 Neil Wagner (2003–2005) Played for Oakland Athletics in 2011 and the Toronto Blue Jays in 2013-14
 Jay Flaa (2013–2015) Played for the Baltimore Orioles and Atlanta Braves in 2021, currently a free agent
 Bennett Hostetler (2017–2021) Currently Plays on High-A Beloit for the Miami Marlins
 Parker Harm (2017–2021) Played in the High-A minors for the Kansas City Royals in 2022. Also played for the Brisbane Bandits of the Australian Baseball League in 2022.

Division I Awards and Honors

All-Summit League
First Team
2012
Tim Colwell
John Straka
2013
Wes Satzinger
Tim Colwell
Kyle Kleinendorst
Joe Hechtner
2014
Michael Leach
2016
Drew Fearing
2017
Logan Busch
2019
Max Loven
2021
Bennett Hostetler
Jake Malec
Cade Feeney
Parker Harm
2022
Calen Schwabe
Logan Williams

Summit League Player of the Year
Tim Colwell (2014)

Summit League Coach of the Year
Tyler Oakes (2022)

Summit League Newcomer of the Year
Max Loven (2019)

See also
 List of NCAA Division I baseball programs

References

External links